Jeffrey Dean 'Jeff' Ransom (born November 11, 1960) is an American former Major League Baseball player from Fresno, California.

Career
Drafted in the 5th round of the 1978 amateur draft by the San Francisco Giants, Ransom appeared in 26 games as a catcher for the Giants from 1981 to 1983.

References

External links

1960 births
San Francisco Giants players
Baseball players from California
Sportspeople from Fresno, California
Major League Baseball catchers
Living people
African-American baseball players
Albuquerque Dukes players
American expatriate baseball players in Italy
Charlotte O's players
Durham Bulls players
Fresno Giants players
Greenville Braves players
Phoenix Giants players
Rochester Red Wings players
Shreveport Captains players
Toledo Mud Hens players
Nettuno Baseball Club players
21st-century African-American people
20th-century African-American sportspeople